Legend Land is an EP by the symphonic metal band Leaves' Eyes, released on June 2, 2006 as a follow-up to the album Vinland Saga. Almost all vocals are by Liv Kristine, but there are also some death growls in the tracks "Legend Land", "Viking's Word", and "The Crossing" provided by Alexander Krull.

Track listing

Personnel

Leaves' Eyes
Liv Kristine Espenæs Krull - lead vocals, keyboards
Alexander Krull - death grunts, keyboards, programming, samples
Thorsten Bauer - guitars, keyboards
Mathias Röderer - guitars, keyboards
Christopher Lukhaup - bass, keyboards
Moritz Neuner - drums, percussion, keyboards

Additional musicians
Timon Birkhofer - cello  
Sarah Nuchel - violin

Production
Produced, engineered, mixed and mastered by Alexander Krull at Mastersound Studios
Assistant recording engineers: Mathias Röderer, Thorsten Bauer, Chris Lukhaup

Charts

References

2005 EPs
Leaves' Eyes albums
Napalm Records EPs
Albums produced by Alexander Krull
Cultural depictions of Leif Erikson